Burnet Elementary School can refer to several schools, including:
 Burnet Elementary School (El Paso, Texas)
 Burnet Elementary School (Galveston, Texas)
 Burnet Elementary School (Houston, Texas)